Reeta Sisko Hanhijoki, née Markkanen (born 25 April 1962 in Rautalampi) is a retired Finnish sprinter, who specialized in the 60, 100 and 200 metres. She won a bronze medal at the 1989 European Indoor Championships. Domestically, she won 28 national championship titles in the 60, 100 and 200 metres indoor and outdoor between 1985 and 1993.

Early career
Hanhijoki was born in Rautalampi and represented the club Vesannon Urheilijat. In her early career she competed in the 4 x 100 metres relay at the 1983 World Championships, and in the 100 metres at the 1986 European Championships without reaching the final. She competed at 60 metres and 200 metres at the 1988 European Indoor Championships and the 1989 World Indoor Championships without reaching the final.

International breakthrough
At the 1989 European Indoor Championships she won the bronze medal in the 60 metres behind Nelli Fiere-Cooman and Laurence Bily. She also finished sixth in the 200 metres. At the 1990 European Championships she reached the semi-final of both the 100 metres and semi-final of the 200 metres. At the 1991 World Indoor Championships she finished eighth in the 60 metres and sixth in the 200 metres. At the 1991 World Championships she only reached the quarter-final of the 100 metres and semi-final of the 200 metres. The Finnish team also participated in the relay. At the 1992 Olympic Games she reached the semi-final of both the 100 and 200 metres, but only round one of the 4 x 100 metres relay. She also finished eighth at the 1992 IAAF World Cup. At the 1993 World Indoor Championships she reached the semi-final of both the 60 metres and sixth in the 200 metres. At the 1993 World Championships she competed in the 4 x 100 metres relay.

Hanhijoki became Finnish champion in both 100 and 200 metres in 1985, 1986, 1988, 1989, 1990, 1991 and 1992. She also became Finnish indoor champion in the 60 metres in 1985, 1987, 1988, 1989, 1990, 1991, 1992 and 1993; and in the 200 metres in 1985, 1987, 1988, 1989, 1990 and 1991. The hegemony in Finnish women's sprint was taken over by Sanna Kyllönen, née Hernesniemi.

Hanhijoki's personal best time in the 60 metres (indoor) was 7.20 seconds, achieved in February 1990 in Nice. In the 100 metres she had 11.24 seconds, achieved at the 1991 World Championships; and in the 200 metres she had 22.81 seconds, achieved in July 1991 in Lappeenranta. She also co-holds the Finnish record in the relay.

International competitions

1Representing Europe

References

1962 births
Living people
People from Rautalampi
Finnish female sprinters
Athletes (track and field) at the 1992 Summer Olympics
Olympic athletes of Finland
Olympic female sprinters
Sportspeople from North Savo